McKean Township is one of the 25 townships of Licking County, Ohio, United States. As of the 2010 census, the population was 1,523.

Geography
Located in the northern part of the county, it borders the following townships:
Burlington Township - north
Washington Township - northeast
Newton Township - east
Granville Township - south
St. Albans Township - southwest corner
Liberty Township - west
Bennington Township - northwest corner

No municipalities are located in McKean Township.

Name and history
It is the only McKean Township statewide.

Government
The township is governed by a three-member board of trustees, who are elected in November of odd-numbered years to a four-year term beginning on the following January 1. Two are elected in the year after the presidential election and one is elected in the year before it. There is also an elected township fiscal officer, who serves a four-year term beginning on April 1 of the year after the election, which is held in November of the year before the presidential election. Vacancies in the fiscal officership or on the board of trustees are filled by the remaining trustees.

References

External links

County website

Townships in Licking County, Ohio
Townships in Ohio